Penstraze is a hamlet north of Chacewater in west Cornwall, England.

References

Hamlets in Cornwall